The Runciman Mission to Czechoslovakia was a British Government initiative aimed at resolving an international crisis threatening to lead to war in Europe in the summer of 1938. The Mission, headed by a former British cabinet minister Lord Runciman, was sent to mediate in a dispute between the Government of Czechoslovakia and the Sudeten German Party (SdP), representing the radicalised ethnic German minority within the country. The British mediators were active on the ground in Czechoslovakia during the late summer, issuing their report shortly before the Munich Conference in September.

Background

The crisis in Czechoslovakia arose from demands for territorial autonomy (and probable eventual secession) for the predominantly German-speaking areas located mainly along the western borders of Czechoslovakia, which became known as the Sudetenland. These territories with population of over 3 million ethnic Germans were historically parts of Lands of Bohemian Crown and Germans have been settling the area since the 13th century. The territory had been included in Czechoslovakia, largely for strategic and economic reasons, at the formation of the state in 1918. Following Adolf Hitler’s rise to power in neighbouring Germany in 1933, the German minority population within Czechoslovakia, radicalised by economic hardship and propaganda, turned to the SdP – which emulated the Nazis across the border. In April 1938, the party leader, Konrad Henlein, demanded not only full administrative autonomy for the German areas but also the right to practice National Socialism within them. Earlier, in March 1938, during a meeting with Hitler in Berlin, Henlein was instructed to keep tension high by continuing to make demands of the Czechoslovak authorities but to avoid reaching a settlement with them. The secret plan of preparation for the invasion of Czechoslovakia, “Case Green”, was set for completion by 1 October 1938.

Negotiations
Lord Runciman and his small team arrived in Prague on 2 and 3 August 1938. Although ostensibly independent of the British Government, a key member of the Mission was Frank Ashton-Gwatkin, technically on secondment from his official duties at the London Foreign Office. Separate negotiations were held with the Czechoslovak Government and the SdP with a view to achieving a mediated settlement of the dispute. During meetings with the Czechoslovak President, Edvard Beneš, and other government officials, Runciman repeatedly pressed for significant concessions be made to the SdP. Runciman also met Henlein on several occasions but did not subject him to the same pressure for an agreement. 

The Czechoslovak Government initially resisted the SdP demand for full autonomy of the German areas but, under intense diplomatic pressure from Britain and France (Czechoslovakia’s principal ally), Beneš conceded the point in the so-called 'Fourth Plan' – in effect, calling the bluff of the SdP. This development caused the SdP to break off contacts with the Czechoslovak authorities and led to an increase of unrest in the German areas. The situation was further exacerbated by a bellicose speech from Hitler on September 12 which triggered an uprising in the Sudeten territories. Decisive action by the Czechoslovak authorities restored order and the SdP leadership fled to Germany.

In this atmosphere of rising international tension in Central Europe, Runciman was summoned back to London on 16 September to brief ministers. The following day he informed a meeting of the Cabinet that, in his view, ‘’Czechoslovakia could not continue to exist as she was today’’ and some territory would have to be ceded to Germany, even if "no more than cutting off certain fringes". Other solutions – including the use of a plebiscite for the German areas, the creation of an independent Sudeten-German state, the calling of a four-power conference, the federalisation of Czechoslovakia or the implementation of a variant of Benes’s ‘Fourth Plan’ – Runciman now considered impractical.

Visiting Hitler
Towards the end of August, the lack of progress in negotiations in Czechoslovakia, accompanied by signs of increasing belligerence in Nazi Germany, prompted the British Government to seek direct contact with Hitler. The initial idea was for Runciman to undertake the task. He, however, resolutely refused to do so. Arguing that it would compromise the independence of his Mission (and also on account of suffering ill health in the late summer heat in Prague), he declared: “I am just not going to do it!” Runciman’s refusal resulted in the Prime Minister, Neville Chamberlain, developing plans for the dramatic step of himself flying to Germany to meet Hitler at Berchtesgaden on 15 September.

Report
The report of the Runciman Mission, in the form of letters to the British and Czechoslovak prime ministers dated 21 September 1938, was strongly hostile in tone towards the Czechoslovak Government and recommended the immediate transfer of the mainly German-inhabited territories to Germany. The 2000-word report placed the responsibility for the breakdown in negotiations very firmly on the SdP leadership who used the pretext of civil unrest in some German areas to sever contacts. The report also noted that Beneš’s 'Fourth Plan' proposals met “almost all the requirements” of the SdP’s demands. Nevertheless, when itemising the grievances of the German minority, Runciman expressed his sympathy for the Sudeten case observing that it was “a hard thing to be ruled by an alien race”. Although declaring that Czech rule was “not actively oppressive, and certainly not ‘terroristic’”, the report alleged “it was marked by tactlessness, lack of understanding, petty intolerance and discrimination”.

The issues complained of, in addition to the electoral system in which the SdP could be outvoted in parliament, included the appointment of Czech officials in German areas, Czech farmers moving into these areas and Czech schools being built for their children, discrimination in favour of Czech firms in government contracts and Czechs receiving preferential economic relief. Runciman was highly critical of the Czechoslovak authorities for failing to provide adequate remedies for these perceived injustices. This failure, he noted, resulted in a feeling of ”hopelessness” amongst the German population but the “rise of Nazi Germany” gave them “new hope”, adding: “I regard their turning for help towards their kinsmen and their eventual desire to join the Reich as a natural development in the circumstances.” Foreseeing the danger of increased violence and even “civil war”, Runciman considered that the “frontier districts should at once be transferred from Czechoslovakia to Germany”, without recourse to a plebiscite which would be a “sheer formality”. Amongst other measures the report proposed the neutralisation of the remainder of Czechoslovakia and an international guarantee of its security.

The report ostensibly provided the evidential basis for the proposals made by Chamberlain during his second meeting with Hitler at Bad Godesberg on 22 September. These proposal involved the transfer to Germany of those districts in Czechoslovakia with a majority German population. Archival evidence suggests that the report was revised at a late stage, probably by Ashton-Gwatkin, in order to bring the document fully into line with British policy. The original draft of the report proposed the transfer of some territory, though the extent of the area concerned is open to question. However, when previously addressing the Cabinet on 17 September, Runciman indicated that he had in mind the specific possibility of transferring the areas with high concentrations of German inhabitants around the towns of Cheb and Aš, in the extreme west of the country.

Reactions
Runciman’s activities in Czechoslovakia were eagerly followed by a large international press corps, some of whom, in the course of their reporting, were critical of the use of his leisure time. The 67-year-old mediator (who was accompanied in Czechoslovakia by his wife, Hilda) spent most of his weekends relaxing in the company of the Sudeten German aristocracy, many of whom were supporters of the SdP. These activities were arranged at the behest of the SdP with the aim of exposing the mediator to a social milieu favourable to their cause. Despite his rejection of the criticism, Runciman’s claim of impartiality became severely compromised in the eyes of many.

Following the publication of the Runciman report on 28 September, the American journalist Dorothy Thompson drew attention to a perceived internal inconsistency in the document, terming it “illogical”. She also expressed the suspicion that the report was “made to order to fit the agreement” reached between Hitler and Chamberlain at Berchtesgaden and was a “piece of propaganda”. Ashton-Gwatkin subsequently stated that Runciman had asked him to write a report that would “support the Prime Minister’s policy”.

Bibliography

 Vyšný, Paul, The Runciman Mission to Czechoslovakia, 1938: Prelude to Munich, Basingstoke, 2003.
 Wiskemann, Elizabeth, Czechs and Germans: A Study of the Struggle in the Historic Provinces of Bohemia and Moravia, 2nd edn., London, 1967.

Notes

References

Territorial disputes of Czechoslovakia
History of the foreign relations of the United Kingdom
Politics of World War II
Munich Agreement
Sudetenland